USS Dawson (APA-79) was a  that served with the US Navy during World War II. Commissioned late in the war, she was initially assigned to transport duties and consequently did not participate in combat operations.

Dawson (APA-79) was named after counties in Georgia, Montana, Nebraska, and Texas. She was launched 27 November 1944 by Consolidated Steel at Wilmington, California, under a Maritime Commission contract; transferred to the Navy 3 February 1945; and commissioned the next day.

Operational history

World War II
Clearing San Francisco 3 April 1945, Dawson carried passengers and cargo to Espiritu Santo, Tulagi, and Nouméa before arriving at Brisbane, Australia, 6 May to reload. On 14 May she got underway for the Philippines and until the end of the war, carried men and equipment of construction battalions from Manus and New Guinea.

After hostilities

Dawson embarked occupation troops at Pearl Harbor from 18 August to 1 September 1945, landing them at Sasebo 22 September. Four days later she was en route to transport additional troops to Japan, returning to Sasebo 14 October.

Operation Magic Carpet

Assigned to "Magic Carpet" duty carrying veterans eligible for discharge home to the west coast she departed Sasebo 22 October and embarked Army Air Corps personnel at Saipan, arriving at San Francisco 14 November.

Operation Crossroads
Following another voyage to the Western Pacific between 30 November 1945 and 16 January 1946, carried sailors from Guam to San Francisco, arrived San Francisco 30 January 1945. Then she was assigned as a test target to Operation Crossroads, the atomic weapons tests in the Marshall Islands.

Decommission
After Operation Crossroads, Dawson was towed to Kwajalein where she was decommissioned 20 September 1946.

References
Dawson (APA-79), DANFS Online.
APA-79 Dawson, Navsource Online.

 

Gilliam-class attack transports
Transports of the United States Navy
World War II auxiliary ships of the United States
World War II amphibious warfare vessels of the United States
Dawson County, Georgia
Dawson County, Montana
Dawson County, Nebraska
Dawson County, Texas
Ships built in Los Angeles
1944 ships
Ships involved in Operation Crossroads
Ships sunk as targets
Maritime incidents in 1946
Maritime incidents in 1948